Águas Belas (literally Beautiful Waters) is a Brazilian municipality in the state of Pernambuco.

History

The region where Águas Belas is located was originally inhabited by the Tupiniquim, who were expelled by the Carnijó tribe.  The first Europeans arrived around 1700.  Until 1904, Águas Belas was a district of Buíque.

The name "Águas Belas" (Portuguese for "Beautiful Waters") originated from the commentary of a judge who was visiting the city and was impressed by the excellent quality of the water in the town.

Geography
 State - Pernambuco
 Region - Agreste Pernambucano
 Boundaries - Buíque and Pedra   (N);  Alagoas state   (S);  Iati   (E);   Itaíba  (W)
 Area - 885.98 km2
 Elevation - 336 m
 Hydrography - Ipanema River
 Vegetation - Caatinga Hiperxerófila
 Climate - semi arid hot
 Annual average temperature - 24.5 c
 Distance to Recife - 315 km
 Population - 43,686 (2020)

Economy
The main economic activities in Águas Belas are based in industry, commerce  and agribusiness especially plantations of beans, corn and manioc; and creations of cattle, goats, sheep, horses, pigs and chickens.

Economic indicators

Economy by Sector
2006

Health indicators

References

Municipalities in Pernambuco